Josie Marcus may refer to:

 Josephine Marcus, who later married Wyatt Earp 
 Josie Marcus (Scandal), a fictional character on the U.S. TV series Scandal
 Josie Marcus, Mystery Shopper, a series of books by author Elaine Viets